The 1966–67 season was Aberdeen's 54th season in the top flight of Scottish football and their 56th season overall. Aberdeen competed in the Scottish League Division One, Scottish League Cup and Scottish Cup.

Results
Own goal scorers in italics.

Division 1

Final standings

Scottish League Cup

Group 1

Group 1 final table

Knockout stage

Scottish Cup

References

 
 AFC Heritage Trust

Aberdeen F.C. seasons
Aber